Manzonia bravensis is a species of minute sea snail, a marine gastropod mollusk or micromollusk in the family Rissoidae.

Description

Distribution

References

bravensis
Gastropods of Cape Verde
Fauna of Brava, Cape Verde
Gastropods described in 1987